Shohei Shimowada (born 23 October 1990) is a Japanese judoka.

He is the bronze medallist of the 2016 Judo Grand Slam Tokyo in the -100 kg category.

References

External links
 

1990 births
Living people
Japanese male judoka
20th-century Japanese people
21st-century Japanese people